Delhi has significant reliance on its transport infrastructure.  The city has developed a highly efficient public transport system with the introduction of the Delhi Metro, which is undergoing a rapid modernization and expansion since 2006. There are 16.6 million registered vehicles in the city as of 30 June 2014, which is the highest in the world among all cities, most of which do not follow any pollution emission norm (within municipal limits), while the Delhi metropolitan region  (NCR Delhi) has 11.2 million vehicles. Delhi and NCR lose nearly 42 crore (420 million) man-hours every month while commuting between home and office through public transport, due to the traffic congestion. Therefore, serious efforts, including a number of transport infrastructure projects, are under way to encourage usage of public transport in the city.

History
Prior to independence in the 1940s, public transport in the city was in private hands, with people relying mainly on tongas  and the bus service of the 'Gwalior Transport Company' and 'Northern India Transport Company'. But with the growing city, it soon proved inadequate, thus Delhi Transport Corporation (DTC) bus system was established in  May 1948. The next big leap in city transport was the opening of Delhi Metro, a rapid transit system in 2002.

Overview
Public transport in the metropolis includes the Delhi Metro, the Delhi Transport Corporation (DTC) and DIMTS (Delhi Integrated Multi Modal Transit System) bus system, auto-rickshaws, cycle-rickshaws, e-rickshaws, Grameen Seva and taxis.  With the introduction of Delhi Metro, a rail-based mass rapid transit system, rail-based transit systems have gained ground.  Other means of transit include suburban railways, inter-state bus services and private taxis which can be rented for various purposes.  However, buses continue to be the most popular means of transportation for intra-city travel, catering to about 60% of the total commuting requirements.

Private vehicles account for 30% of the total demand for transport, while the rest of the demand is met largely by auto-rickshaws, taxis, rapid transit system and railways.

Indira Gandhi International Airport (IGI) serves Delhi for both domestic and international air connections, and is situated in the south-western corner of the city. In 2009–2010, IGI recorded a traffic of more than 25.01 million passengers, both Domestic and International. Heavy air traffic has emphasised the need for a secondary airport, which is expected to be Taj International Airport near Greater Noida, alongside the Delhi-Agra highway.

The Delhi government planned to have 413 km of metro, 292 km of BRT, and 50 km each of monorail and light rail by 2020.

Currently, the only international rail service in Delhi is the Samjhauta Express to Lahore, while it is possible to change trains to board rail services to Bangladesh and Nepal which commence in other cities of India.  For the future, a high-speed rail link is being considered that would link New Delhi with Kunming, China via Myanmar

Intra-city Transport

Road transport

Roads in Delhi are maintained by Municipal Corporation of Delhi (MCD), New Delhi Municipal Council (NDMC), Delhi Cantonment Board (DCB), Public Works Department (PWD) and Delhi Development Authority (DDA). At 1749 km of road length per 100 km2, Delhi has one of the highest road densities in India. Major roadways include the Ring Road and the Outer Ring Road, which had a traffic density of 110,000 vehicles per day in 2001. Total road length of Delhi was 28,508 km including 388 km of National Highways. Major road-based public transport facilities in Delhi are provided by DTC buses, auto-rickshaws, taxis and cycle-rickshaws.

Buses

Delhi Transport Corporation (DTC) operates the world's largest fleet of CNG-powered buses. After Pune, Delhi was the second city in India to have an operational Bus rapid transit (BRT) system.

Delhi has one of India's largest bus transport systems. Buses are the most popular means of transport catering to about 60% of Delhi's total demand. Buses are operated by the state-owned Delhi Transport Corporation (DTC), which owns largest fleet of Compressed Natural Gas (CNG)-fueled buses in the world, private Blueline bus operators and several chartered bus operators.  It is mandatory for all private bus operators to acquire a permit from the State Transport Authority. The buses traverse various well-defined intra-city routes. Other than regular routes, buses also travel on Railway Special routes; Metro Feeder routes.  Mudrika (Ring) and Bahri Mudrika (Outer Ring) routes along Ring and Outer-Ring road respectively are amongst the longest intra-city bus routes in the world. With the introduction of bus rapid transit (BRT) and the development of dedicated corridors for the service, bus service is set to improve. The DTC has started introducing air-conditioned buses and brand new low-floor buses (with floor height of 400 mm and even higher on one third area as against 230 mm available internationally.) on city streets to replace the conventional buses. A revamp plan is underway to improve bus-shelters in the city and to integrate GPS systems in DTC buses and bus stops so as to provide reliable information about bus arrivals.
In 2007, after public uproar concerning the large number of accidents caused by privately owned Blueline buses, the Delhi government, under pressure from the Delhi High Court decided that all Blueline Buses shall be phased out and be eventually replaced by low floor buses of the state-owned DTC. The Delhi Government has decided to expedite this process and will procure 6,600 low floor buses for the DTC by commonwealth games next year in mid 2020.
At present in 2019,  the fleet size of buses in Delhi is as follows:

 DTC-5000
 DIMTS-1157
 Metro Feeder-117
 Total – 6274

Auto-rickshaws
The auto-rickshaws (popularly known as Auto) are an important and popular means of public transportation in Delhi, as they are cheaper than taxis.  Hiring an Auto in Delhi is very tricky, as  very few auto-drivers agree to standard meter charges.  The typical method is to haggle for an agreeable rate.

Taxis

Though easily available, taxis are not an integral part of Delhi public transport. The Indian Tourism Ministry and various private owners operate most taxis. The Tourism Ministry grants private companies permits to operate taxis. Recently, Radio Taxis have started to gain ground in Delhi.  Some companies provide an on-call radio taxi service, which is slightly more expensive than conventional Black and Yellow taxis.

Cycle-rickshaws
Cycle-rickshaws are a popular mode of travel for short distance transits in the city. The pedal-powered rickshaws are easily available throughout the city and reckoned for being cheap and environment friendly. Often, tourists and citizens use them for joyrides, too. Of late, they have been phased out from the congested areas of Chandni Chowk because of their slow pace, which often leads to traffic snarls on the streets of Old Delhi. Still, they are the great source of public transport in Delhi.

Major Arteries

Inner Ring Road
Inner Ring Road is one of the most important "state highways" in Delhi. It is a 51 km long circular road, which connects Northern, eastern, Western and Southern areas in Delhi. Owing to more than 2 dozen grade-separators/flyovers, the road is almost signal-free.  The road is generally 8-laned with a few bottlenecks at certain stretches, which are being removed. The road has already achieved its carrying capacity of 110000 vehicles per day and would require an addition of more lanes to fulfill needs of increasing traffic by 2011.

Outer Ring Road
Outer Ring Road is another major artery in Delhi.  The road which was almost neglected till the early 2000s is now an important highway that links far-flung areas of Delhi.  The road is 6-8 lane and has grade-separators and a large number are under construction as a part of project to make the artery signal free.  The road along with the ring road forms a ring which intersects all the National Highways passing through Delhi.

Expressways and National Highways

Delhi is connected by NH 1, NH 2, NH 8, NH 10 and NH 24. It also has three expressways (six- and eight-lane) that connect it with its suburbs. Delhi–Gurgaon Expressway connects Delhi with one of its financial hubs, Gurgaon, DND Flyway connects Delhi with its other financial hub, Noida and Delhi–Faridabad Skyway which connects Faridabad, major suburb to Delhi. Four more expressways are also planned.

Noida–Greater Noida Expressway connects Noida with Greater Noida, which is an upcoming financial and commercial hub and is also to have a new Jewar International Airport. A 135.6-km long Western Peripheral Expressway, also known as the Kundli–Manesar–Palwal Expressway, which became operational on 19 November 2018, will relieve Delhi of the congestion of heavy night traffic and will act as a bypass for the night vehicles.

NH 24 or Ghaziabad Road is a four-lane national highway which connects Delhi to Lucknow via Ghaziabad. As the Commonwealth Village is located close by Yamuna bridge on this highway, underpasses and flyover being built will help facilitate traffic between the eastern areas of Delhi/ Western UP and the rest of the city.

Rail transport
Rail based transport in the city has started to gain popularity with the introduction of Delhi Metro.  Ring-Railway, which runs parallel to the Ring-Road system is another rail-based intra-city transport facility in Delhi.

Metro

The Delhi Metro is being built in phases. Rapid increase of population coupled with large-scale immigration due to high economic growth has resulted in ever increasing demand for better transport, putting excessive pressure on the city's existent transport infrastructure. Like many other cities in the developing world, the city faces acute transport management problems leading to air pollution, congestion and resultant loss of productivity. In order to meet the transportation demand in Delhi, the State and Union government started the construction of a Mass Rapid Transit system, known as Delhi Metro in 1998. The project started commercial operations on 25 December 2002 between Shahdara and Tis Hazari) on the Red Line. It has set performance and efficiency standards and is continuously expanding. As of January 2022, the network consists of nine colour-coded regular lines along with the faster Airport Express line, with a total length of  serving 254 stations. The system has a mix of underground, at-grade, and elevated stations using both broad-gauge and standard-gauge. Phases III (112 km) and IV (108.5 km) will be completed by 2018 and 2025 respectively, with the network totaling 413.8 km, making it longer than the London Underground.

The inauguration of the Dwarka–Barakhamba Road corridor of the Blue Line marked the completion of Phase I in October 2006. 
Phase IV is planned to be completed by 2025.

Description of the Delhi Metro lines that currently operate as of January 2022 is as follows:

Ring Railway

Ring railway is a 35-kilometre circular railway network in Delhi that runs parallel to the Ring Road. It was laid back in 1975 primarily to service freight trains that could bypass the crowded and passenger-heavy Old Delhi and New Delhi railway stations. The network was upgraded for the 1982 Asian Games with the introduction of 24 additional services. Its circular route is 35 km (22 mi) long, which the trains takes 90–120 minutes to complete, both clockwise and anti-clockwise, via the Hazrat Nizamuddin Railway Station. The ring railway service was quite popular through the 80s and 90s when Delhi's transport infrastructure was just gathering pace, but since then, with the rapid expansion of the Delhi Metro coupled with an extensive bus network, the ring railway has remained neglected by the city as well as the Railways. On average, only 3700 passengers take the trains every day. The biggest reason for the failure of the railway is a lack of a feeder network, such as approach roads and feeder buses to the stations. The stations are situated at remote locations and are difficult to access by passengers. There is also a problem of security as many stations have been encroached. The trains on this network also run behind schedule most of the time. The network is now utilized as a freight corridor and limited passenger train services are available during peak hours.

Inter-state transport

Railway connectivity

Delhi is connected to whole of the nation through Indian Railways vast network. New Delhi Railway Station which is one of the most busiest stations in Indian Railway system serves as headquarters of Northern Railways. A large load of inter-state transport is borne by railways. 5 major Railway Stations in the city include New Delhi Railway Station, Old Delhi Railway Station, Hazrat Nizamuddin Railway Station, Sarai Rohilla and Anand Vihar Railway Terminal. A large number of local passenger trains connect Delhi to its sub-urban areas and thus provide convenient travel for daily commuters. Railways also share a large amount of freight traffic in Delhi.

Road

Highways

The city is believed to have the highest road density in the country and is well connected to rest of the nation through five major national highways, namely NH 1, NH 2, NH 8, NH 10 and NH 24. The highways around city are being upgraded into expressways with ultra-modern facilities.

Bus services
Regular bus services are available from inter-state bus terminals in the city.  The services are extended to all the northern states and the neighbouring areas of Delhi.  Services are provided by state transport corporations and several private operators.  The 3 inter-state terminals in city are:
 ISBT Kashmere Gate in Northern Delhi
 ISBT Anand Vihar in Trans-Yamuna area
 ISBT Sarai Kale Khan in South Delhi

Airports
Indira Gandhi International Airport (IGI) serves Delhi for both domestic and international connections, and is situated in the southwestern corner of the city, alongside Delhi-Gurgaon Expressway. In the year 2015–16, IGI recorded a traffic of over 48 million passengers. Being the busiest airport in the South Asian region, IGI airport has three terminals - Terminal 1 & Terminal 2 for domestic operations only and Terminal 3 - with mixed use i.e. primary International and the rest of the domestic operations(Vistara and Air India) - in addition of T1 & T2

The airport was and still witnessing massive expansion and modernisation  by a consortium led by GMR Infra. The new Terminal T3 was inaugurated in 2010 in line of the historic Commonwealth Games being held and Delhi is today India's only city to have an airport of this size. Terminals 4, 5 and 6 will be built in a phased manner. By 2024, airport will have four runways and will handle more than 100 million passengers per year.

Hindon Domestic Airport in Ghaziabad was inaugurated by Prime Minister Narendra Modi as the second airport for the Delhi-NCR Region on the 8 March 2019.

Apart from the expanded IGI airport, Delhi might also receive a second international airport by 2024. The airport, being named as Taj International Aviation Hub, is proposed to be located in Jewar in Greater Noida. It would be around 75 km from IGI airport.

East-west connectivity bridges

Yamuna bridges in Delhi

The total length of the Yamuna inside Delhi is 22 km from the Wazirabad barrage to the Okhla barrage. This stretch of the river has 14 bridges (nine of them for road traffic), including those built by Delhi Metro (4) and Indian Railways (1). 4 bridges are under construction — 1 for road traffic and 3 for rail traffic.

 Road Bridges
 Old Wazirabad bridge (barrage-cum-bridge)
 Signature Bridge
 Yudhishthir Setu
 Rajghat/Geeta Colony bridge
 Old ITO bridge, Vikas Marg (barrage-cum-bridge)
 New Nizamuddin Bridge
 DND Flyway
 Okhla barrage bridge
 Barapullah Phase-III extension (under construction)

 Road-Rail Bridges
 Old Yamuna Bridge (Lohe-ka-Pul)

 Rail bridges
 Delhi Metro 
 Kashmere Gate to Shastri Park (Red Line)
 Indraprastha to Yamuna Bank (Blue Line)
 Nizamuddin to Mayur Vihar (Pink Line)
 Kalindi Kunj to Okhla Bird Sanctuary (Magenta Line)
 Jagatpur to Sonia Vihar (Pink Line) (under construction)
 Indian Railways
 New Yamuna Bridge (under construction)

  Delhi-Meerut RRTS
 Under construction

Other bridges in NCR
 IIT Flyover

Future projects

There are many transport infrastructure projects underway in Delhi.  Most have their deadlines set in late 2009 and early 2010, just before the 2010 Commonwealth Games.  They are listed below -

Rail
 Upgrading of New Delhi and Old Delhi railway stations of Northern Railways.
 Delhi metro has new line of super-fast Delhi Airport Express Line having maximum speed of 135 km/h line to connect to IGI Airport.
 Introduction of Monorail (45 km) and Light Rail Transit has been aborted till 2010.
 Reintroducing Trams in the Chandni Chowk and Red Fort areas of the city. 
 Anand Vihar Railway Terminal to reduce the train loads over Old Delhi Station and New Delhi Railway Station. Besides that the station will also serve the densely populated Eastern part of Delhi, along with the neighbouring suburbs of Ghaziabad and Noida.
 A high-speed rail link that would link New Delhi with Kunming, China via Myanmar

Road
 Two upcoming bridges over Yamuna will connect Faridabad to Noida and Greater Noida. One of the bridges would connect Faridabad-Noida-Ghaziabad (FNG) expressway from Noida's Sector 150 to National Highway 1  in Faridabad. The other bridge is proposed to link Noida's Sector 168 with Faridabad's Badoli village (Near Bypass Road) Government has already approved construction of the road connecting Faridabad and Greater Noida that will improve the connectivity with clearances received from both Haryana and Uttar Pradesh Governments The much-awaited FNG (Faridabad-Noida-Ghaziabad Expressway) is finally coming on track and will provide fast connectivity to daily commuters of the area once complete; apart from this, it is also emerging as an excellent stretch for real estate development. FNG Expressway is around 56 km long with 19.9 km in Noida–Greater Noida region, 8 km in Ghaziabad, while the rest 28.1 km is in the Faridabad region, especially the developing sectors of Neharpar Faridabad or Greater Faridabad. According to the plan, FNG from Noida side will become operational in the next 14 months while it would take three years for the whole stretch to become fully operational The completed expressway designed by IIT-Roorkee will offer commuters direct connectivity between Noida and Greater Faridabad
 DND–KMP Expressway project has been approved in March 2019 which will connect DND Flyway at Maharani Bagh, Delhi to Faridabad bypass road near Badarpur border. According to PWD officials, the bypass will connect the DND Flyway, cutting across the Agra Canal along the Yamuna, which runs perpendicular to Sarita Vihar and ends near Badarpur border, which further connects to Faridabad. "Commuters heading from east Delhi, South Delhi and Noida to Faridabad will be able to avoid the road to Ashram Chowk completely and that will help de-congest the area for local users. The estimated cost of the project is INR 3,580 crores and will be completed in three phases. In the first phase, the stretch from Maharani Bagh (at DND Flyway) to Kalindi Kunj will be completed. In the second phase, the stretch from Kalindi Kunj to Faridabad will see completion. The third phase will be from Sector-62/65 dividing road in Faridabad to KMP Expressway interchange near Sohna." The bypass will dramatically reduce travel time between Delhi and Faridabad as it will serve as an alternative to Mathura Road. Unified Traffic and Transportation Infrastructure (Planning and Engineering) Centre (UTTIPEC) gave the Public Works Department (PWD) its consent to move ahead after Lieutenant-Governor Najeeb Jung gave the approval to the project.

Air
 Revamp of IGI Airport is underway to improve its infrastructure, passenger capacity and efficiency.
 Jewar Airport in Gautam Budhh Nagar district will start operations in 2025.
 Union Civil Aviation Minister Ashok Gajapathi Raju inaugurated the Rohini Heliport on February 28, 2017.

Delhi Traffic Police transport helpline
Owing to a large number of complaints from consumers, the Delhi Government in association with Delhi Traffic Police runs a staffed transport helpline which can be reached at 011-23010101 while dialing from within the city. Citizens can make traffic related complaints and suggestions. One can also report traffic violations observed and misbehavior/refusal/overcharging by autorickshaws, buses and taxis.

See also
Transport in India
Bus rapid transit (BRT)
Clean development mechanism
Delhi Metro
Delhi Transport Corporation
Highways passing from Delhi

References and notes

External links

 Department of Transport, Government of Delhi (Official Website)
 Delhi Integrated Multi Modal Transit System Ltd. (DIMTS)